S. Asch may refer to:

Sholem Asch (1880–1957), Polish-Jewish novelist
Solomon Asch (1907–1996), Polish-American psychologist